More Adventurous is the third studio album by American indie rock band Rilo Kiley. Released on August 17, 2004 by Brute/Beaute Records, a self-made imprint distributed by Warner Records, it was the band's major label debut.

As of June 2007, sales of the album in the United States had exceeded 173,000 copies, according to Nielsen SoundScan.

Song information
"Portions for Foxes" references the bible verse .

"Ripchord" and "It Just Is" were written in response to the death of Elliott Smith.

"Accidntel Deth" was produced by Jimmy Tamborello, who is known for his work in The Postal Service and as Dntel (which explains the unusual spelling of the song's title).

"More Adventurous" alludes to a line from Frank O'Hara's "Meditations in an Emergency": "Each time my heart is broken it makes me feel more adventurous (and how the same names keep recurring on that interminable list!), but one of these days there’ll be nothing left with which to venture forth."

Release
Two versions of the album were released: a version in a jewel case, which was sold in stores, and a limited edition (1,000 copies) digipak version sold at the release party and concert for the album.

"I Never" and "Ripchord" were included in several feature films, including Must Love Dogs, Conversations with Other Women, and John Tucker Must Die. "Portions for Foxes" is included as part of the Rock Band 3 soundtrack and was also featured in the first episode of the first season of the medical drama Grey's Anatomy. "More Adventurous" was featured on the soundtrack to the 2005 film Wedding Crashers.

Reception
The album received critical praise. Noted rock critic Robert Christgau named it the fifth best release of 2004 and later included it in his list of the greatest albums of the 2000-2009 decade, placing it in the twenty-fourth spot. Christgau also declared "It's a Hit" song of the year for 2004 and subsequently listed it as the eighth best song of the decade. The album placed fourteenth on the Pazz & Jop poll for 2004.

In 2017, NPR Music's Ilana Kaplan dubbed the album "a masterpiece in songwriting vulnerability." Kaplan dubbed Jenny Lewis "an emo pioneer", citing her "bold confrontation of anger and her ability to mourn in such a raw way" as reasons. She also noted that Lewis' handling of topics like marriage, divorce, and more "set apart her perspective in the midst of male voices" within emo.

Track listing

Personnel
Sourced from AllMusic.
Jenny Lewis – vocals, guitar, Mellotron, keyboards, Wurlitzer, piano, harmonica, organ
Blake Sennett – vocals (lead on "Ripchord"), electric & acoustic guitars, 12-string acoustic guitar, handclaps, Optigan, JX-3P Arp, & Moog 
Pierre de Reeder – bass guitar 
Jason Boesel – drums, percussion

Additional musicians 
Mike Bloom, Danny Cooksey, Amy Huffman, Clint Wheeler, Jamie Williams, Jon Hischke, Kianna Alarid, Mike Mogis, Nate Lefeber, Nate Walcott, Neely Jenkins, Nick White, No Better Cause, Rick Ricker, Summit Strings

Chart performance

See also 
 Brute/Beaute Records

References

External links 
 Official Rilo Kiley website

Rilo Kiley albums
2004 albums
Albums produced by Mark Trombino
Warner Records albums